String Theory is a double album by Hanson, released on November 9, 2018, featuring the Prague Symphony performing string arrangements by composer David Campbell. The album was produced by Hanson.

Promotion
Hanson promoted the album with the String Theory Tour.

Track listing
Disc 1
 "Reaching for the Sky (Pt.1)" 
 "Joyful Noise"
 "Where's the Love" originally on Middle of Nowhere
 "Dream It Do It"
 "MMMBop" originally on Middle of Nowhere
 "Chasing Down My Dreams"
 "Tragic Symphony" originally on Anthem
 "Got a Hold on Me" originally on The Walk
 "Yearbook" originally on Middle of Nowhere
 "Siren Call"
 "Me Myself and I" originally on Shout It Out

Disc 2
 "Reaching for the Sky (Pt. 2)"
 "This Time Around" originally on This Time Around
 "Something Going Round" originally on The Walk
 "Battle Cry"
 "You Can't Stop Us" originally on Anthem
 "Broken Angel" originally on Underneath
 "What Are We Fighting For"
 "Breaktown"
 "No Rest for the Weary"
 "I Was Born" originally on Middle of Everywhere: The Greatest Hits
 "Sound of Light"
 "Tonight" originally on Anthem

Charts

References

2018 albums
Hanson (band) albums